Bo Christian Larsson (born 1976 in Kristinehamn, Sweden) is a Swedish artist who works mostly with large-sized drawings, installations, performances and objects. 

Born in 1976 in Sweden, Larsson entered the AKI Academy of Visual Arts in  1994 Enschede, Holland.  In 1997 he was an exchange student at Western Australia's College of Fine Arts in Perth, Australia.   In 1998, he finished at AKI.

From 2004 to 2008 he lived and worked in Munich, Germany, then moved Hamburg, where he achieved the Philipp Otto Runge Scholarship for one year. 

Larsson lives and works in Älvkarhed, Sweden and Berlin, Germany.

Commentary

Stephanie Rosenthal, curator: "Although the Swedish artist works with obvious symbolism, his work remains mystic and arcane and reminds one of a foreign land that wants to be discovered." in: Favoriten 08. Neue Kunst in München, exh.cat., Lenbachhaus, Munich, Germany, pp.70 – 75.

Bo Christian Larrson: "I think this is the only costume you can wear at all, it makes so little and so much with your body at the same time. No big deal. You put on the wig and you are a different person. This has always fascinated me. I have the wig in front of my eyes. I turn it around, so I can't see anything. This is a very important point in my performances, that I blind myself and have to take a look inside. I become a different person and disappear in this role." (Interview on Bavarian Radio, 24.06.2008)

Stephanie Rosenthal, curator: "Rites of passage are specifically important in Larsson's work. This phase stands for „already-loosening" of the old condition and "not-yet-arrived" in a new condition. In this "twilight-zone" there are the most possibilities to new thoughts. It seems as if Larsson wants to remain there. He becomes a border crosser, an intermediate being, passing through a permanent process of transformation." (in: Favoriten 08. Neue Kunst in München, exh.cat., Lenbachhaus, Munich, Germany, pp.70 – 75)

Bo Christian Larsson: "I feel uncomfortable as a human in our time. That's why I hardly create new products, but try using already existent material." (SZ newspaper, 26./27.01.2008 in „Der Mann aus dem Wald")

Exhibitions

Selected solo exhibitions
 2015: Bo Christian Larsson, Galleri Bo Bjerggaard, Copenhagen
 2014: Bo Christian Larsson, TS Art Projects, Berlin
 2013: Bo Christian Larsson, DH-Artworks, Düsseldorf, Germany
 2013: Bo Christian Larsson, Institut für moderne kunst-Nuremberg, Germany
 2013: Bo Christian Larsson, Schaustelle Pinakothek der Moderne, Munich, Germany
 2013: Bo Christian Larsson, TS Art Projects, Berlin, Germany
 2013: Bo Christian Larsson, Borås Art Museum, Borås, Sweden
 2012: Bo Christian Larsson, Christian Larsen Gallery, Stockholm, Sweden
 2012: Bo Christian Larsson, Ludlow 38, New York City, USA
 2012: Bo Christian Larsson, Gallery Vogt, New York City, USA
 2012: Bo Christian Larsson, Kalmar Konstmuseum, Sweden
 2012: Bo Christian Larsson, Kristinehamns Konstmuseum, Sweden
 2010: Cataclysmic Raft, Performance on Sylt, Kunstraum Sylt Quelle, Germany
 2010: A White Mess Pt. 2b, Soundfair, Berlin, Germany
 2010: Open Space, Art Cologne, Cologne, Germany
 2010: The Intruder, Tongewoelbe T25, Ingolstadt, Germany
 2009: Drifting Across That Thin Line, Steinle Contemporary, Munich, Germany
 2009: For Earthly Things..., Magazin4, Bregenzer Kunstverein, Bregenz, Austria (Sept. 2009)
 2008: Silverscreams, Gallery Gad, Oslo, Norway
 2008: What was made in the dark, will be brought to the light, Galerie Florian Walch, Munich, Germany
 2006: An Itchy Howl Under a Skin Coloured Moon, Von Maltzahn Fine Arts, Munich, Germany
 2006: a mediocre squirt in a commonplace tilts the real, Gallery GAD, Oslo, Norway
 2005: Oil for food, Fuel for fools, Off Space Du Ag, Munich, Germany

Selected group exhibitions, happenings and performances
 2016: 20th Biennale of Sydney, Sydney NSW
 2015: Time Lies – KIK Seven, Kino International, Berlin
 2015: Navigare necesse est – Seefahrt tut Not, Schaufenster, Berlin
 2015: Borås – Västerås Tur och Retur, Västerås konstmuseum, Västerås
 2015: Tech 4 Change, Vestfossen Kunstlaboratorium, Vestfossen (cat.)
 2015: Alma Löv Museum CIA, Östr. Ämtervik, Sweden
 2014: Stipend Exhibition, Teater Galleriet, Off Konsten, Uppsala
 2014: All creatures small and great, C.H.ART Christina Haubs, Munich
 2014: Alma Löv Museum CIA, Östr. Ämtervik
 2014: Grooving Images, TS Art Projects, Berlin
 2014: Borås International Sculpture Biennale, Borås
 2014: Protect me From What I am, Galerie Dina Renninger, Munich
 2014: Skoteinos, Pavillion, Bad Gastein
 2014: Skoteinos, Worldroom 42, Munich
 2014: About Sculpture #2, Gallery Rolando Anselmi, Berlin
 2014: Symphonie Plastique, Le Carré de Vincennes, Vincennes
 2014: Drive the Change, 100plus, Zurich
 2013: Overcoming History, Galerie Schmidt-Handrup, Berlin
 2013: Overcoming History, Galerie Schmidt-Handrup, Cologne
 2013: Approdo al futuro, Palazzo Orlando, Livorno
 2013: New Positions, Art Cologne, Cologne
 2013: Welovepaintings, DH-Artworks, Düsseldorf
 2013: Manche mögen’s schwer, DH-Artworks, Düsseldorf
 2012: himmelgrau., Galerie Bezirk Oberbayern, Munich
 2012: Im Raum des Betrachters / Skulptur der Gegenwart, Pinakothek der Moderne, Munich
 2012: EORUM SANAI, Arario Gallery, Cheonan
 2012: Socle du Monde Biennale, Herning Museum of Contemporary Art, Herning
 2012: Falling From Grace – Junge Schwedische Kunst, Rostock Kunsthalle
 2011: Jahresgaben 2011, Kunstverein München, Munich
 2011: Jahresgaben 2011, Braunschweiger Kunstverein, Braunschweig
 2011: Hot Spot Berlin, Georg Kolbe Museum, Berlin
 2011: The True Artist Helps the World by Revealing Magic Truths, D21 Art Space, Leipzig
 2011: Colliding Discourses, Shiryaevo Biennal, Samara
 2011: Eyes Wide Shut, Vogt Gallery, New York
 2011: Into the Wildwoods, Galleri Bo Bjerggaard, Copenhagen
 2011: Unlängst im Wald, Bayerische Staatsforsten, Regensburg
 2010: Petersburg, Available Works at HBC, Karl-Liebknecht-Str. 9, Berlin, Germany
 2010: Hayward Closure Poster Project, Hayward Gallery London, UK
 2010: Tales from the forest, Virserums Konsthall, Virserum, Sweden
 2010: Gegenüber und Miteinander, Kunstprojekt auf dem Weg zum ÖKT 2010, Munich, Germany
 2009: Jahresgaben 2009, Kunstverein München, Munich, Germany
 2009:	Interesting Productions, The Office, Berlin, Germany
 2009: Walking in my mind, Hayward Gallery, London, UK
 2009: Extra Extra, China Art Objects Galleries, Los Angeles, USA
 2009: Minton's Playhouse, Artnews Projects, Berlin, Germany, organized by: Caravan Berlin
 2008: Indifference, Forum Kreuzberg, Skalitzer Str. 133, Berlin, Germany
 2008: The waste land, caravan Berlin, Berlin, Germany
 2008: Out There in the middle of nowhere, Galerie Der Künstler, Munich, Germany
 2008: Favoriten 2008, Kunstbau, Lenbachhaus, Munich, Germany
 2008: Interesting Productions III, The Fortress of Day and Night, ZK-Max München, Munich, Germany
 2008: Hell-O-World pt. 1 (Sweden), Happening in Kristinehmans Konstfoerening, Sweden
 2008: Toy-Void, A performative identity project as a part of "Doing Identity", Kammerspiele München, Munich Germany
 2008: Interesting Productions II, shown in the collection of Lenbachhaus, Munich, Germany
 2007: Königskinder, Residenzmuseum, Munich, Germany
 2007: B. Line, Ter Caemer-Meert Contemporary, Nieuwerke, Belgium
 2007: Our House Reverbed, performance in Nacht Linie-Kammerspiele, Kammerspiele München, Munich Germany
 2007: I can eat that, Providence RI, USA
 2006: Interesting Productions II, Three man show in "Lothringer 13", Munich, Germany
 2006: Out, Household and Birds-reinventions of A. Kaprow's Happenings as a part of the exhibition "Allan Kaprow" in Haus der Kunst, Munich Germany
 2006: daydream demolition (a speculation), performance as a part of the theater piece "Bunny Hill 2", Kammerspiele München, Munich Germany
 2006: Bonnie Prince German, Low Salt Gallery, Glasgow, Scotland
 2006: Panic, our older brother, Gallery ALM, Munich, Germany
 2005: kkk becomes santa…REDIALLED, performance as a part of the exhibition "kunstlerbruder", Haus der Kunst, Munich, Germany
 2005: Imagen, luz y sonido para el desarollo, Centre civic Barcelonetta, Barcelona, Spain
 2005: Copy your idol, Organized by the Berlin Foundation of Contemporary art, Kunsthalle Berlin Pankow, Berlin, Germany
 2005: kkk becomes santa and santa becomes kkk, performance in the exhibition "Experiment Dunstkreis", Westendstr., Munich, Germany
 2005: On a road to permanent demonstration, Utopia Station in World Social Forum, Porto Alegre, Brazil
 2005: If Spiderman is real, so is Utopia!, Performance in "Utopia Station", Haus der Kunst, Munich Germany
 2004: Voids and Fillings, Kellereingang Ost of Haus der Kunst, Munich, Germany
 2004: Young artist, Kristinehamns konstmuseum, Kristinehamn, Sweden
 2003/04: Now and then, Kristinehamns konstmuseum, Kristinehamn, Sweden
 2002: Mindmapping happening, EMPIRE Global Mobile, Berlin, Tokyo, New York, Haus des Lehrers, Berlin, Germany
 2002: Mindmapping Video project on the Four seasons hotel in Berlin
 2002: The human body in return, Alma Lövs museum of unexpected art in Östra Ämtervik, Sweden
 2002: Stockholm Art-Fair on sollentunamässan, Stockholm, Sweden
 2002: Young artist, Kristinehamns konstmuseum, Kristinehamn, Sweden
 2001: Project Mindmapping FfM, Künstlerhaus Mousonturm, Frankfurt/Main, Germany
 2001: Performance Falling down REDUX, Künstlerhaus Mousonturm, Frankfurt/Main, Germany
 2001: Performance Engraved episodes, with Leif Alexis, Treptower Park, Berlin, Germany
 2001: Scholarship exhibition on Kristinehamns museum of modern art (received a letter of honor)
 2000: Supposedly forgotten, Performance on the Ullriken mountain in Bergen, Norway
 2000: Petra Jensen, Jonas Liveröd, B. Christian Larsson, Kristinehamns art hall, Kristinehamns, Sweden
 2000: Holland, what makes things go-go?, Väsby art hall, Upplands väsby, Sweden
 1999: Future park, AIAS Int. Artist seminary in Amsterdam, Holland
 1998: B. Christian Larsson and Johannes Buss, Gallerie de Villa, Enschede, Holland
 1998: Group examination exhibition on the AKI, Enschede, Holland
 1998: Liljevalchs spring exhibition 1998
 1997: Everything is duty-free in Eden, Gallery De R.A.T, Enschede, Holland
 1997: Sculpture survey, Gomboc Gallery, Perth, Australia

Grants and awards
 2014: Swedish Arts Council Artist Stipend, Stockholm, Sweden
 2013: VHV-Gruppe, Artist of the year, Hannover, Germany
 2012: Premio Combat 2012 Prize, Livorno, Italy (category painting)
 2010: flux factory Residency Scholarship, New York, USA
 2009: Kunst:Raum Sylt Quelle, artist in residence, Sylt, Germany
 2008/09: Philipp Otto Runge Scholarship, Hamburg, Germany
 2006: Musik in öffentlichen Raum, Kulturreferat München, Munich, Germany
 2002: Young artist, Kristinehamns konstmuseum, Kristinehamn, Sweden

Collections
 -- VHV, Hannover, Germany
 -- Borås Konstmuseum, Borås, Sweden
 -- FRAC Ile‐de‐France, Le Plateau, Paris, France
 -- Hamburger Kunsthalle, Kupferstichkabinett, Hamburg, Germany
 2008: Pinakothek der Moderne, Munich, Germany
 2008: Staatliche Graphische Sammlung München, Munich, Germany
 2006: Städtische Galerie im Lenbachhaus, Munich, Germany
 2006: Hans Mayer, Düsseldorf, Germany
 2006: Kristinehamns Museum for Modern Art, Kristinehamn, Sweden
 2006: Statoil / Hydro Collection, Oslo, Norway

Selected bibliography
 2012: himmelgrau., Galerie Bezirk Oberbayern, Munich, Germany, pp. 8–9, 24–29
 2012: Bo Christian Larsson, Ludlow 38, New York City, US
 2012: Bo Christian Larsson, Kalmar Konstmuseum, Sweden
 2012: Bo Christian Larsson, Kristinehamns Konstmuseum, Sweden
 2011: Falling From Grace – Junge Schwedische Kunst, Rostock Kunsthalle, Germany
 2011: Colliding Discourses, Shiryaevo Biennal, Samara, Russia
 2011: Unlängst im Wald, Bayerische Staatsforsten, Regensburg, Germany
 2011: Cataclysmic raft – out of harms way, Stiftung Kunstraum Sylt Quelle, Hamburg, Germany
 2011: Bo Christian Larsson, Gallery Bo Bjerggaard, Copenhagen, Denmark
 2011: “100” by Francesca Gavin, published by Laurence King, London, UK
 2011: Bo Christian Larsson, Kunstverein Braunschweig, Braunschweig, Germany
 2010: Vokabelkrieger V Aufbruch, published by Hybriden – Verlag Berlin, Germany
 2010: Das ist Programm, steinle contemporary, Munich, Germany, pp. 34–39
 2010: Gegenüber und Miteinander (exhibition booklet), Munich, Germany, pp. 22–23
 2009: Bo Christian Larsson "For Earthly Things Where Turned Into Watery, And What Before Swam In The Water Now Went Upon The Ground", (exh. cat.)
 2009: Walking in my mind, Hayward Gallery, Sounthbank Centre, London (exh.cat.)
 2009: Bo Christian Larsson, On and on is how we are, Monograph, published by Argo Books, Berlin, Germany
 2008: Favoriten 08 Neue Kunst in München, exh.cat., Lenbachhaus, Munich, Germany, pp. 70–75, p. 107
 2008: Kom Hem. Tjugo Värmländska Konstnärer Återvänder! Rackstadmusset, Arvika, Sweden, exh.cat.
 2008: Bo Christian Larsson, What was done in the dark, will be brought to the light, Munich, exh.cat.
 2007: MONOPOL, 12/2007, December, pp. 94–96
 2007: Kunstforum, No. 184, March–April 2007, pp. 358–361
 2007: Artforum, February 2007, pp. 282–285
 2006/07: Allan Kaprow. 18 Happenings in 6 Parts, p. 66–67
 2006/07: Art as Life, Haus der Kunst, Munich, 2006/2007, pp. 66–67

References

External links
 http://bochristianlarsson.com

1976 births
Living people
Swedish contemporary artists